Mountain Sprout is a vocal and acoustic band from Eureka Springs, Arkansas, United States.  Although they are sometimes labeled as bluegrass, their music draws on a wide array of influences.

Discography
PornoBilly - 2005
One More for the Ditch - 2007
Fambilly Hour - 2008
Into The Sun - 2009
Habits To Feed - 2010
Refried Best O’ The Beans - 2011
Long Time Comin' - 2014

External links
 Official Website

American bluegrass music groups